Zacharzowice  is a village in the administrative district of Gmina Wielowieś, within Gliwice County, Silesian Voivodeship, in southern Poland. In the mid-18th century, the settlement was for a short period owned by the von Wrochem family.

The village has a population of 355.

References

Villages in Gliwice County